FK Kareda was a Lithuanian football team from the city of Šiauliai and re-located from Šiauliai to Kaunas in 2000. It was dissolved in 2003.

Before 2000 it was known as "Kareda Šiauliai". In 1995–1996 it was known as "Kareda-Sakalas Šiauliai". Before 1995 it was known as "Sakalas Šiauliai". In 1990 was founded Sakalas, in 1995 this club was sponsored by the criminal group "Princai" from Šiauliai. When Lithuanian police and power structures stike to this criminal elements, the football club lost sponsorship and was sold and in 2000 removed to Kaunas.

History

1990–1995 

In 1990 m. was founded as Sakalas; 1990 m. they were in Baltic league, and since 1991 m. in Top division of Lithuania (Aukščiausia lyga).

Five seasons in top division was without titles; in 1995 m. club found new investors and sponsorship.

1995–1999 
1995 m. was made some kind of the re-branding and "Sakalas" changed name into "Kareda–Sakalas".

From 1996 they were known only as FK Kareda. This club was under control of the crime elements of Šiauliai City. They had ambitious plans and sponsored club. The best players were in club and FK Kareda won championship and LFF Cup tournament. In 1999 Lithuanian police strike to the crime groups and some left Lithuania, some were in jails, and without sponsorship, the club had financial problems.

2000 

Before 2000 season club was sold and removed to Kaunas. New owner was Vladimir Romanov, also owner of FBK Kaunas. Two clubs with one owner could not play in the same league, so Kareda was relegated to second level. Later (in 2003) defunct.

Participation in Lithuanian Championships 
 2003 – 14th
 2002 – 10th
 2001 – 9th (Kareda Kaunas was not anymore eligible to play as being farm clubs of FBK Kaunas)
 2000 – 5th
 1999 – 4th
 1998–99 – 2nd
 1997–98 – Champions
 1996–97 – Champions

Achievements 
A Lyga: 2
 1997, 1998

Lithuanian Cup: 3
 1974, 1996, 1999

Lithuanian SSR Championship: 2
 1969, 1977

Season by season (since 1991)

Head coaches 
 Algimantas Liubinskas, 1996–1997
 Šenderis Giršovičius, 1997–1998, 1999
 Aleksandr Piskarev, 1999
 Valdemaras Martinkėnas, 1999 autumn

Famous players 
 Igoris Pankratjevas, 1994
 Remigijus Pocius, 1992, 1995
 Igoris Kirilovas, 1995
 Vidas Dančenka, 1997
 Artūras Fomenka, 1996, 1999
 Tadas Gražiūnas, 1998
 Tomas Kančelskis, 1995, 1997, 1999
 Darius Maciulevičius, 1999
 Saulius Mikalajūnas, 1996–1997
 Irmantas Stumbrys, 1995–1996
 Tomas Žiukas, 1995–1997
 Audrius Žuta, 
 Rimantas Žvingilas, 1995–1996

References

External links
 futbolinis.lt
 foot.dk 
 RSSSF.com
 List of Champions
 Lithuania – List of Cup Finals

 
Defunct football clubs in Lithuania
Association football clubs established in 1935
Association football clubs disestablished in 2003
1935 establishments in Lithuania
2003 disestablishments in Lithuania